Saint-Eusèbe may refer to:

Saint-Eusèbe, Haute-Savoie, a commune in the French region of Rhône-Alpes
Saint-Eusèbe, Saône-et-Loire, a commune in the French region of Bourgogne
Saint-Eusèbe, Quebec, a parish municipality in the province of Québec